Helen Armstrong may refer to:

Helen Armstrong (activist) (1875–1947), Canadian labour leader
Helen Armstrong (violinist) (1943–2006), American violinist
Helen Maitland Armstrong (1869–1948), American stained glass artist
Nellie Melba (1861–1931), Australian opera soprano, married name Helen Armstrong